Death of a Salesman is a play by Arthur Miller.

Death of a Salesman may also refer to:
 Death of a Salesman (1951 film)
 Death of a Salesman (1961 film)
 Death of a Salesman (1966 U.S. film), television film that aired on CBS
 Death of a Salesman (1966 UK film), television film that aired on BBC
 Death of a Salesman (1968 film)
 Death of a Salesman (1985 film), adaptation directed by Volker Schlöndorff
 Death of a Salesman (1996 film)
 Death of a Salesman (2000 film)
 "Death of a Salesman" (song), from the album The Great Destroyer, by Low

See also
 Death of a Traveling Salesman, by Eudora Welty